Notre Dame of St. Therese of the Child Jesus (NDST; formerly Canonico Antonio Institute, Inc.) is a private educational institution in General Santos, Philippines. It offers primary education, junior high school and senior high school, in adherence to the K-12 education system as implemented in the Philippines. The school is administered by the Disciples of St. Therese of the Child Jesus (DST), a religious congregation.

The school's only campus in the Philippines is located along Purok Nopol Road, Sitio Nupol, Barangay Conel in General Santos.

History 
In 1992, Jovita Onez, a devout Catholic Christian from General Santos donated one hectare of land to the DST congregation. The Mother General at that time, with the consent of the     accepted the donation and decided to establish a convent and school in the said place.

The construction of the new convent started in 1999 and after a couple of months, the making of the proposed school was set into operation. Both buildings were finally established in 2001 with all its furnishings and were officially blessed and opened on January 3, 2001. By the following months, the DST Sisters were accepting enrollees for preschool and primary education. The school had officially set into operation on the opening of the academic year of the same year.

References

External links 
 Congregation of the Disciples of St. Therese of the Infant Jesus (DST)
 Canonico Antonio Institute

Private schools in the Philippines
2001 establishments in the Philippines